The partial lunar eclipse of 26 June 2010 was the first of two lunar eclipses in 2010. At maximum eclipse, 53.68% of the moon was covered by the earth's shadow.

This eclipse is a part of Lunar Saros 120 series, repeating every 18 years and 10 days, last occurring on 15 June 1992, and will next repeat on 6 July 2028. This series is winding down: The final total eclipse of this series was on 14 May 1938 and the final partial lunar eclipse will be on 28 July 2064.

Visibility 

The entire umbral phase was visible after sunset Saturday evening throughout the Pacific, New Zealand, Australia, the Philippines and Japan. The point where the moon was directly overhead at maximum eclipse lay over the South Pacific Ocean, far to the southwest of Hawaii. The lunar eclipse seen over the Philippines on Saturday evening despite rainshowers and thick clouds, but it was clearly visible throughout the night sky.

Map

It was seen before sunrise on Saturday morning setting over western North and South America:

Photo gallery

Related eclipses

Eclipses of 2010 
 An annular solar eclipse on 15 January.
 A partial lunar eclipse on 26 June.
 A total solar eclipse on 11 July.
 A total lunar eclipse on 21 December.

Lunar year (354 days) 

This eclipse is the one of five lunar eclipses in a short-lived series. The lunar year series repeats after 12 lunations or 354 days (Shifting back about 10 days in sequential years). Because of the date shift, the Earth's shadow will be about 11 degrees west in sequential events.

Metonic series (19 years)

Half-Saros cycle
A lunar eclipse will be preceded and followed by solar eclipses by 9 years and 5.5 days (a half saros). This lunar eclipse is related to two total solar eclipses of Solar Saros 127.

Tritos series
 Preceded: Lunar eclipse of July 28, 1999
 Followed: Lunar eclipse of May 26, 2021

Tzolkinex 
 Preceded: Lunar eclipse of May 16, 2003
 Followed: Lunar eclipse of Augusy 7, 2017

See also 
List of lunar eclipses and List of 21st-century lunar eclipses

Notes

External links 

 
 Hermit eclipse: 2010-06-26
 www.timeanddate.com: Partial Lunar Eclipse on June 26, 2010
 www.shadowandsubstance.com: Flash animation
Photos:
 APOD June 28, 2010 A Partial Lunar Eclipse
 SpaceWeather.com - June 26, 2010 lunar eclipse photo gallery

2010-06
2010 in science
June 2010 events